Claudio Miguel Jara Granados (born 6 May 1959) is a former Costa Rican football striker who played more than a decade for Herediano and participated in the 1990 FIFA World Cup finals.

Club career
Born in Heredia, Jara began playing football with local side Herediano. He made his debut in 1982, and became Herediano's all-time leading goal-scorer, with 98 league goals during his 11 years with the club. He totalled 375 matches for the club. He spent 15 seasons playing in the Costa Rican Primera División with Herediano, Alajuelense, Guanacasteca and Carmelita. In 1992, Jara left Herediano to sign with Alajuelense. A six-month spell with Colombian side Atlético Bucaramanga followed.

In 1994, he returned to Heredia, but quickly moved to El Salvador to play one season with Alianza. Next, he returned to Costa Rica and played for Guanacasteca and Carmelita, retiring from football after suffering a serious knee injury in 1996.

International career
He was part of the national team squad, that played in the 1990 FIFA World Cup held in Italy and featured in all four games played. The striker made his debut for the Ticos in 1983 and collected 46 caps, scoring 11 goals.

He played his final international on December 17, 1994 against Saudi Arabia.

Managerial career
After he retired from playing football, Jara became a football coach. He was appointed manager of Sagrada Familia in January 2010. In December 2012 he resigned at Herediano after 4 months at the helm.

Personal life
His brother Geovanny Jara played 422 matches for Herediano and also played for the national team.

References

External links
 

1959 births
Living people
People from Heredia Province
Association football forwards
Costa Rican footballers
Costa Rica international footballers
1990 FIFA World Cup players
1991 CONCACAF Gold Cup players
C.S. Herediano footballers
L.D. Alajuelense footballers
Atlético Bucaramanga footballers
Alianza F.C. footballers
A.D. Carmelita footballers
Costa Rican expatriate footballers
Expatriate footballers in Colombia
Liga FPD players
Categoría Primera A players
Expatriate footballers in El Salvador
Costa Rican expatriate sportspeople in Colombia
Costa Rican expatriate sportspeople in El Salvador
Costa Rican football managers
Copa Centroamericana-winning players